Michèle Leservoisier (8 September 1965) is a French retired track and field athlete who competed in long-distance running events. She won the marathon at the 2001 Francophone Games in 2:44:00, a Francophone Games record.

Statistics

Personal bests

 10 kilometres: 35:33, Lille, France, 1 September 2001
 10 miles (road): 1:00:02, Rosny-sous-Bois, France, 7 October 2001
 Half marathon: 1:15:58, La Grande Motte, France, 3 March 2002
 Marathon: 2:38:11, Paris, France, 8 April 2001
 100 kilometres: 8:45:00, Saint Augustin-des-Bois, France, 15 June 2003

International competitions

References

Association of Road Race Statisticians (ARRS) profile
French Athletics Federation profile
Planète Marathon profile

1968 births
Living people
French female long-distance runners
French female marathon runners
French ultramarathon runners
Female ultramarathon runners